Luella May Law (born 17 March 1934) is a Canadian sprinter. She competed in the women's 100 metres at the 1952 Summer Olympics. Law was eliminated in the heats of the 1954 British Empire and Commonwealth Games 80 metres hurdles.

References

1934 births
Living people
Athletes (track and field) at the 1952 Summer Olympics
Canadian female sprinters
Canadian female hurdlers
Olympic track and field athletes of Canada
Athletes (track and field) at the 1954 British Empire and Commonwealth Games
Commonwealth Games competitors for Canada
Athletes from Vancouver